"Pineapple Head" is a song by Australian-New Zealand rock band Crowded House from their fourth studio album, Together Alone. It was released as a single in September 1994.

The song was later included on the group's greatest hits compilation Recurring Dream. It was also performed by the band in their farewell concert Farewell to the World in 1996. The song was left off the initial VHS release and television broadcast, but was, however, restored for the ten-year anniversary DVD release. In 2005, Natalie Imbruglia recorded a version of "Pineapple Head" to contribute to She Will Have Her Way, a tribute to Neil Finn and Tim Finn by various female musicians and bands.

Cover art
The single's cover art was created by Reg Mombassa, the artist responsible for creating the clothing brand Mambo Graphics and who had also been a member of popular Australian band Mental as Anything. The cover features a man with three eyes and a pineapple for a head, indicative of the song title.

Composition
The original inspiration for the song was Neil's son, Liam Finn, who uttered several phrases which later became lyrics while affected by fever. The song shares musical similarities with "Norwegian Wood" by the Beatles. The song is somewhat unique in the modern pop/rock era, being a 3/4 time signature song, compared to most contemporary music being in 4/4. This gives it a unique, waltz-like swing. On the live album, LIVE 92–94, Pt. 1 – Track 8, Neil counts out 1,2,3 1,2,3 after slowing the band down during the performance intro.

Reception
Junkee described it as, "a sea-shanty waltz, with steely guitars and a cooing Mellotron beneath it. Compositionally it’s part "Norwegian Wood", part "Golden Brown", all Crowded House."

Track listings
CD and 12-inch single
 "Pineapple Head" – 3:28
 "Weather with You" – 3:44
 "Don't Dream It's Over" – 3:55
 "Together Alone" – 3:55

Cassette single
 "Pineapple Head" – 3:28
 "Weather with You" – 3:44

Charts

Notes

1994 singles
Crowded House songs
Songs written by Neil Finn
1993 songs
Capitol Records singles